Tawuia is a millimetric disc-shaped, most likely multicellular macrofossil from the Neoproterozoic.  It is considered to be synonymous with Chuaria and Longfengshania, which, in turn, are thought to represent different life stages of the same organism.

Tawuia describes a more sausage- or crescent-shaped fossil; Chuaria refers to more discoial instances.

The fossils are often preserved as organic compressions.  They are considered to represent microbial structures; some authors consider them to be affiliated with slime molds

Chuaria is multicellular.

References

Prehistoric biotas
Incertae sedis